The Gap is a full-length album by Joan of Arc. It released in 2000 on Jade Tree Records.

Production
The album was made almost entirely using ProTools.

Critical reception
Exclaim! wrote: "With each album, the band pushes their craftsmanship for the obscure even further, and The Gap is a prime result of this." The Chicago Tribune deemed the album "a frustrating, daring and sometimes unlistenable entry in the band's canon." PopMatters wrote that it "may be one of the most unlistenable albums in existence."

Track listing
 (You) [I] Can Not See (You) [Me] As (I) [You] Can - 3:19
 As Black Pants Make Cat Hairs Appear - 7:48
 Knife Fights Every Night - 5:07
 John Cassavetes, Assata Shakur, And Guy Debord Walk Into A Bar... - 0:54
 Another Brick At The Gap (Part 2) - 2:57
 Zelda - 1:56
 "Pleasure Isn't Simple" - 3:18
 Me And America (Or) The United Colors Of The Gap - 5:18
 Your Impersonation This Morning Of Me Last Night - 9:11
 Outside The Gap - 2:45

References

Joan of Arc (band) albums
2000 albums
Jade Tree (record label) albums